Tomislav "Toma" Zdravković (20 November 1938 – 30 September 1991) was a Serbian pop-folk singer-songwriter and recording artist.

Zdravković was an outstanding figure on the Serbian folk scene; a true bohemian and a poet, he lived up to his sad songs. The songs, although having the form of Serbian folk music, had the spirit of chansons. He had a characteristic baritone vocal, not too powerful but warm, resembling that of Charles Aznavour. The violin underlined the melancholic atmosphere in most songs. Most of the lyrics were written by Zdravković, devoted to unfortunate love, and love-suffering while drinking and singing in omnipresent kafanas. He was married four times.

Some of Zdravković's most renowned songs are "Prokleta nedelja", "Dotak’o sam dno života", "Ostala je samo uspomena", "Pustite me da živim svoj život", "Dva smo sveta različita" and testimonial Pesme moje (My Songs).

Biography
Tomislav Zdravković, nicknamed "Toma", was born in Aleksinac, and lived in Pečenjevce near Leskovac in Serbia, at the time part of Kingdom of Yugoslavia. His father Dušan and his mother Kosara had five children, Tomislav being one of the elder children (including his brother and fellow folk singer Novica Zdravković). The family spent most of Zdravković's life in poverty. There was a high rate of unemployment in his village, thus when he turned 18, he decided to look for a job as a singer in the town of Leskovac. Unfortunately, he didn't have any friends to help him find a job as a singer or advance his singing career. In his biography book, it is mentioned that the popular Bosnian singer Silvana Armenulić met him in a park in Leskovac in 1958 where she grew fond of him, resulting in her aiding him, and Zdravković eventually had a breakthrough, becoming a singer in a kafana in Leskovac called "Dubočica". His unique voice talent was one of a kind and people wanted to hear him more, and thus he became popular in the town. He wanted to see if people in other towns would like him, too, so he moved to Tuzla, Bosnia and Herzegovina where he sang in the Hotel Bristol. His shows were sold out every single night, and he started thinking of composing his own songs.

Music career
Zdravković's first album was named Essagerata, released in 1964. The album consisted of 4 songs: Essagerata, 
Žena moga druga (The Woman Of My Friend), Deca naše zemlje (The Children of Our Contry) and Što te večeras nema. The first three songs were actually just translations of foreign songs of authors Neil Sedaka and Enrico Macias, but the song Što te večeras nema was composed and written by Zdravković, and it was his first published self-written song. His actual first written song was Andjela, which was released later, in 1968.

In 1964, his first true love, a girl named Slavica who Toma loved although she cheated on him, died prematurely at the age of 20 after a serious illness. She was not married and had no children. Zdravković was shocked, and wrote a song named "Buket belih ruža" (A Bouquet of White Roses), but published it years later, and the song is still considered his saddest song, and one of the most depressing songs in Yugoslavian music history.

But still, he did not achieve the so wanted fame with his own songs. Until 1969, when he attended the "Ilidža 1969" music festival, and won the second place with the song "Odlazi, odlazi" written by Blagoje Košanin. Later, around 100,000 copies of the album were sold. And, when Zdravković wrote a song for his friend, Meho Puzić, and it sold around 500,000 (some sources say even 700,000) copies, Zdravković knew it would not be long until he made it big.

In 1969, he and Silvana Armenulić sang in the same group, and Zdravković, to express his gratitude to her for helping him out, wrote the song “Šta će mi život".
 
The song became one of the biggest folk hits ever written in Yugoslavia and transformed Silvana Armenulić, and Zdravković himself, into superstars. But Armenulić's life ironically ended seven years later.

Zdravković later published his own version of the song.

Breakdown
In 1972 he married for the third time, and after a few months the marriage fell apart. Zdravković fell into alcohol addiction and his old bohemian lifestyle. In two years he spent all the money he earned in his 10-year music career. He decided to move to Chicago and try settling down. There, he met his fourth and last wife Gordana and later, his son Aleksandar was born. In 1978, the family decided to move back to Yugoslavia and start anew.

Return to Yugoslavia
Zdravković returned to Yugoslavia and published a song "Umoran sam od života" ("I am tired of life") and immediately became a best-selling artist again. He couldn't believe that the crowds didn't forget him and continued making hits and returned to singing in kafanas and hotels across Yugoslavia. In 1982, he held his first concert in the Belgrade Dom Sindikata, after 26 years of singing. His major hits like "Danka", "Ciganka" ("A little Gypsy girl"), "Prokleta nedelja" ("Damned Sunday") and many others finally came to life, and with cassettes being introduced to the public, music was available to more people.

He started receiving all kinds of offers; He acted in the movie "Balkan Express" and in the TV series "Doktorka na selu".

He organized a few concert tours around Yugoslavia and maintained the fame he gained. In the last years of his life he sang a lot, and enjoyed singing as if he knew it would be over soon. He held his last concert in Podgorica, Montenegro, 14 days before he died.

Death
After 17 years of battle with prostate cancer, Toma Zdravković died on Monday, 30 September 1991 at 7:00 AM, aged 52, in Military Medical Academy, Belgrade.

Discography

This is a list of all the singles, extended plays, and albums that Toma Zdravković recorded during his lifetime:

 Essagerata (1964)
 Dan po dan prolazi (1965)
 Cvetak mali s rosom razgovara (Duet With Milina Stefanović) (1967)
 Detelina sa četiri lista (Duet With Milina Stefanović) (1967)
 Nedžmija (1968)
 Ciganka (1968)
 A nemam baš nigde nikog na ovom svetu (1968)
 Kamena stena (1968)
 Odlazi, odlazi (1969)
 Dok tebe nisam sreo (1969)
 Sliku tvoju ljubim (1970)
 Boli, boli, boli (1970)
 Kad se voli, što se rastaje (1970)
 Pesma o Kitty Swan (Duet With Kitty Swan) (1970)
 Dete Ulice (1970)
 Što te večeras nema (1971)
 Poslednje pismo (1971)
 Živorade (1972)
 O majko, majko (1973)
 Prokleta Nedelja (1973)
 Petlovi poje (1973)
 Sutra se vraćam kuči (1974)
 Nikad neću da te zaboravim (1976)
 Jugoslavijo (1978)
 Umoran sam od života (1979)
 Majko, vrati se (1979)
 Zbogom moja mladosti (1980)
 Mirjana (1980)
 Čekaj me (1981)
 Dva smo sveta različita (1983)
 Dotakao sam dno života (1984)
 E, moje brate (Duet With Novica Zdravković) (1986)
 Dal je moguće (1987)
 Evo me opet (1988)
 Kafana je moja istina (1990)
 Odlazi, odlazi (1991)

External links

1938 births
1991 deaths
Yugoslav male singers
Serbian folk-pop singers
Serbian folk singers
People from Aleksinac
Musicians from Leskovac
Deaths from prostate cancer
20th-century Serbian male singers
Yugoslav expatriates in Canada
Serbian baritones